To Montenegro a.d (stylised as ToMontenegro and 2Montenegro), is the flag carrier of Montenegro, which is branded and operates under the name Air Montenegro (Montenegrin Cyrillic: Ер Монтенегро), a new company opened in early 2021 by the Government of Montenegro. Air Montenegro officially launched operations in June 2021.

History

Background and origins

The predecessor airline company Montenegro Airlines was founded on 24 October 1994, by the government of the Federal Republic of Yugoslavia. The first aircraft, a Fokker 28 Mk4000 (nicknamed "Lovćen"), was purchased almost two years later in 1996. The first commercial flight took place on 7 May 1997, at exactly 10:30 between Podgorica and Bari, Italy. In April 2000, its became a member of the International Air Transport Association (IATA). In June 2000, the first of five Fokker 100 aircraft was delivered to Podgorica Airport. The airline joined Amadeus CRS on 5 March 2003. In 2004, Montenegro Airlines' pilots were the first in the region to be granted the IIIA certificate. In August 2016, it was reported that accounts belonging to Montenegro Airlines had been frozen after the airline failed to comply with a court ruling regarding the payment of debts to the operator of the country's airports. Montenegro Airlines owed the company more than US$15 million.

In December 2020, the Government of Montenegro announced the shutdown and liquidation of the Montenegro Airlines a.d company in the forthcoming weeks stating mismanagement and accumulating losses for several years. Shortly after, it has been announced that the airline will suspend all flights from 26 December 2020 marking the end of its operations.

Airline foundation
On 29 December 2020, it was announced by Minister Mladen Bojanić that the Montenegro Airlines would be reorganized and replaced with a new company the To Montenegro (2 Montenegro), as the new Montenegrin flag carrier airline. The liquidation procedure of Montenegro Airlines would cost about 50 million euro but it is inevitable, as the country's competition authority has ruled that the law for public investment in the flag carrier adopted in 2019 was illegal, the government said in December 2021. 

The new company was officially introduced on 2 March 2021 by the government. In April 2021, it was reported that the Montenegrin government made Air Montenegro the official name for the ToMontenegro project and that the airline would start up using two of Montenegro Airlines' former Embraer-195 aircraft. On 10 June 2021, Minister of Economic Development of Montenegro, Jakov Milatović paid a visit to the neighboring Republic of Serbia, being one of the passengers at the first commercial flight of the new national airline Air Montenegro to Nikola Tesla Airport in Belgrade.

Fleet

References

External links
 Official website

Airlines of Montenegro
Airlines established in 2021
Association of European Airlines
European Regions Airline Association
2020s establishments in Montenegro